Andover Town railway station was a former railway station that served the town of Andover in the English county of Hampshire.  Located on the Andover to Redbridge Line over which the Midland and South Western Junction Railway had running powers, its closure left services to the town to the Andover station, which was formerly known as Andover Junction station.

History

Originally built by the Andover and Redbridge Railway, the station joined the London and South Western Railway and so was absorbed by the Southern Railway during the Grouping of 1923, although The M&SWJR was allocated to the Great Western Railway. The station then passed on to the Southern Region of British Railways on nationalisation in 1948.

This route fell victim to the Beeching Axe in September 1964, three years after passenger trains had been withdrawn from the M&SWJR line.

The site today

The former site is now occupied by the A3057 dual carriageway.

References

 
 
 
 Site and picture 
 Station on navigable O.S. map.
 *Body, G. (1984), PSL Field Guides – Railways of the Southern Region, Patrick Stephens Ltd, Cambridge, 

Disused railway stations in Hampshire
Former London and South Western Railway stations
Railway stations in Great Britain opened in 1865
Railway stations in Great Britain closed in 1964
Beeching closures in England